Tersky District is an administrative and a municipal district (raion), one of the ten in the Kabardino-Balkarian Republic, Russia. It is located in the east of the republic. Its administrative center is the town of Terek. As of the 2010 Census, the total population of the district was 51,220, with the population of Terek accounting for 37.4% of that number.

Administrative and municipal status
Within the framework of administrative divisions, Tersky District is one of the ten in the Kabardino-Balkarian Republic and has administrative jurisdiction over one town (Terek) and twenty-six rural localities. As a municipal division, the district is incorporated as Tersky Municipal District. The town of Terek is incorporated as an urban settlement and the twenty-six rural localities are incorporated into seventeen rural settlements within the municipal district. The town of Terek serves as the administrative center of both the administrative and municipal district.

References

Notes

Sources

Districts of Kabardino-Balkaria
